John Blum (born April 15, 1968) is an American jazz pianist and composer.

Blum has performed and/or recorded with Antonio Grippi, Butch Morris, Charles Gayle, Chris Corsano, Cooper-Moore, Daniel Carter, Darius Jones, Denis Charles, Ed Schuller, Gerald Cleaver, Hamid Drake, Han Bennink, Jackson Krall, Jemeel Moondoc, Karen Borca, Marco Eneidi, Mat Maneri, Michael Wimberly, Peter Brotzman, Tony Scott, Tristan Honsinger, Raphe Malik, Roy Campbell, Jr., Ryan Sawyer, Sabir Mateen, Sunny Murray, Sonny Simmons, Sirone, Steve Swell, Susie Ibarra, Tony Buck, Warren Smith, Wilber Morris, and William Parker.

Biography
Blum is based in New York City, United States. He studied piano with Cecil Taylor and Borah Bergman, and music and composition with Milford Graves and Bill Dixon. Blum has a BS Degree in Biological Science from Bennington College and a MFA Degree in Jazz Composition and Performance.
 
His keyboard technique is something of a jazz hybrid of Cecil Taylor and McCoy Tyner, decidedly percussive but with relentlessly fast right-hand linear structure. Blum plays with such forcefulness and rapidity that he sounds like Conlon Nancarrow's player piano rolls, interpreted via human hands, freed up into a liquid state. He is an underground legend of the downtown music scene in New York, known for his explosive high-voltage pianism, and as a musician who aims for the very personal.

In 2016, Blum continues to work as a soloist and group leader, performing throughout the United States, Europe, Canada, and Mexico.

Discography

As leader
 Naked Mirror (Drimala Records, 2002)
 Astrogeny (Eremite Records, 2006) 
 Who begat Eye (Konnex, 2009) 
 In The Shade of Sun (Ecstatic Peace, 2009)
 Duplexity (Relative Pitch Records, 2020)

As sideman 
 Butch Morris Orchestra – Conduction 117 (Jump Arts Records, 2003)
 Sunny Murray – Perles Noires Volume 2 (Eremite, 2005) 
 Steve Swell – Live at the Vision Festival (Not Two, 2007)
 Steve Swell – 5000 Poems (Not Two, 2009)

Selected reviews 
John Barrtett (jazzusa.com) – 2002
Chris Kelsey (jazztimes.com) – 2005
Clifford Allen (allaboutjazz.com) – 2006
Derek Taylor (bagatellan.com) – 2006)
David Keenan (volcanictongue.com) – 2006
Howard Mandel (Downbeat Magazine) – 2008
 Bruce Gallanter (DMG) – 2009
Tony Porter (Shakenstir) – 2009 
Tony Porter (Shakenstir) – 2009 
Tony Porter (Shakenstir) – 2009 
Massimo Ricci (Touching Extremes) – 2010
Martin Longely (allaboutjazz.com) – 2010 
German Lazaro (Overlook Hotel) – 2011

References

External links
John Blum Website 
Interview: INSIDEJAZZ MAGAZINE (2010)

American jazz pianists
American male pianists
American jazz composers
American male jazz composers
Bennington College alumni
1968 births
Living people
20th-century American pianists
21st-century American pianists
20th-century American male musicians
21st-century American male musicians